The men's 4 × 100 metre medley relay event at the 2006 Commonwealth Games took place on 21 March at the Melbourne Sports and Aquatic Centre, Australia.

The Australian team of Matthew Welsh, Brenton Rickard, Michael Klim and Eamon Sullivan won gold in Commonwealth Games record time, ahead of England's Liam Tancock, Christopher Cook, Matthew Bowe and Ross Davenport. The Scottish team of Gregor Tait, Kristopher Gilchrist,  Todd Cooper and Craig Houston finished third.

Records
Prior to this competition, the existing world and game records were as follows.

The Commonwealth Games record was broken by Australia in the final.

Results

Heats

Final

References
Aquatics at the 2006 Commonwealth Games (official website)

Men's 4 x 100 metre medley relay
Commonwealth Games